The Samoa under-20 rugby union team is Samoa's junior national team. They represent Samoa at the IRB Junior World Championship. After the 2010 Junior World Championship they were relegated to the Junior World Rugby Trophy for second tier nations. They were later promoted to the 2012 Junior World Championship after finishing as winners of the 2011 IRB Junior World Rugby Trophy. The team also competes at the Oceania U20 Championship as of 2015.

Squad

Management
Semo Sititi - Head Coach
Andy Ripley - Team Manager
Robert Johnston - Assistant Coach
Orene Ai'i - Assistant Coach
Joshua Ioane - Physiotherapist
Neru Leavasa - Team Doctor
Andrew Clark - Technical Assistant
Jed Knox - Trainer

Wins against Tier 1 nations

Full internationals
2008: Alatasi Tupou, Maselino Paulo, Roysiu Tolufale (2008), Misioka Timoteo, Afa Aiono, Semiperive Semeane (2009), Richard Muagututia, Levi Asifa'amatala (2010), Fa'atoina Autagavaia (2012), Vavae Tuilagi (2015)
2009: Falemiga Selesele (2010), Fa'atiga Lemalu, Viliamu Afatia (2012), Uini Atonio (2014, France)
2010: Steven Luatua (2013, New Zealand), Patrick Fa'apale, Tulolo Tulolo, Vaiofaga Simanu (2014)
2011: Robert Lilomaiava, Ropeti Lafo (2012), Vavao Afemai, Oneone Fa'afou (2014), Will Skelton (2014, Australia)
2012: Aniseko Sio (2014)

References

under-20
Oceanian national under-20 rugby union teams